Ronald Terence Hart (born 7 November 1961) is a former cricketer who played a single One Day International for New Zealand in 1985. Hart also played for Nelson in the Hawke Cup.

References

1961 births
Living people
New Zealand cricketers
New Zealand One Day International cricketers
Central Districts cricketers
Wellington cricketers
Cricketers from Lower Hutt